Kelly Lochbaum (born April 3, 1973, White Rock, British Columbia) is a former Canadian Football League linebacker for the BC Lions. He is currently a real estate agent in Abbotsford, British Columbia.

Early years 
Lochbaum attended W. J. Mouat Secondary School in Abbotsford, and as a senior, in 1991, was named the School's Athlete of the Year. He went on to play for the Abbotsford Air Force of the Canadian Junior Football League before attending Butte Junior College in [California], and then transferring to Northern Arizona University.

Professional career 
Lochbaum was drafted by the Lions in 1997 and played in 10 games that year, recording 55 tackles and 15 special teams tackles. But for a one-year stint for the Calgary Stampeders in 2001, Lochbaum played for the Lions his entire ten-year career and was considered a stand-out special teams player. He went unsigned, however, as a free agent in 2006.

Career statistics

Notes 

Living people
1973 births
Canadian people of German descent
Players of Canadian football from British Columbia
Canadian football linebackers
Northern Arizona Lumberjacks football players
BC Lions players
People from White Rock, British Columbia